Dom Jean-Baptiste Delaveyne, O.S.B., (1653-1719) was a French Benedictine monk and priest, who founded a religious institute which continues to serve throughout the world.

Delaveyne was born in the village of Saint-Saulge in 1653, in the ancient province of Nivernais. As a teenager, he went to the city of Autun to start his education. After studying with the Society of Jesus, in 1669 he entered the  Abbey of St. Martin in that city, at about the age of 16. He was soon sent to Paris, spending the following seven years studying there. He made his religious profession there in 1670. While there, he was drawn into the artistic and literary circles of the elite of Parisian society. After his ordination in 1676, he was sent to his hometown to serve as its pastor, continuing to lead a life mostly focused on the intellectual pursuits of the literary life.

Two years later, a chance remark by the pastor of a neighboring village contrasting his way of life to that of St. Benedict re-ignited the religious fervor of Delaveyne's youth. He returned to his monastery in Autun for a spiritual retreat, in order to find again the focus of his life. From this experience he returned to his parish a changed man.

In his re-found religious mindset, Delaveyne began to see the misery of the poor of the parish, especially those in the countryside. He started to work to relieve their physical as well as their spiritual needs.

Out of these efforts, in 1680 Delaveyne invited a group of young women of the parish to organize to care for the needs of women and children. He advised them:

In this way, Delaveyne founded the religious congregation of the Sisters of Charity of Nevers, which has operated hundred of convents and schools throughout France since its founding, with its motherhouse still in Nevers. The most famous member of the congregation is St. Bernadette Soubirous, the visionary of Lourdes.

Delaveyne died in Nevers in 1719.

References

1653 births
1719 deaths
French Benedictines
People from Nièvre
17th-century French Roman Catholic priests
18th-century French Roman Catholic priests
Founders of Catholic religious communities
Venerated Catholics by Pope John Paul II
Sisters of Charity of Nevers